John Mair is an associate senior lecturer in broadcast journalism at the Coventry University Department of Media and Communication.

Mair is a former BBC current affairs producer who has also worked for Channel Four and ITV. He helped devise Question Time and Watchdog at the BBC .

Academic background
He has taught at Coventry University since 2005 where he devised the university's best known brand, The Coventry Conversations. He has published five books on journalism and frequently appears in print and broadcast talking about the media.

Mair's books include Mirage in the Desert: Reporting the Arab Revolutions, which focuses on coverage of the 2010 Arab Spring, and Investigative Journalism: Dead or Alive.

Coventry Conversations
Mair has invited household names such as Jon Snow, Kirsty Wark, Jeremy Vine, BBC Director General Mark Thompson, Trevor Philips and Baroness Amos to take part in Coventry Conversations and address students at the university. The "Conversations" were lauded as "the best speaker programme in any British University" by Mair's regular co-author, Professor Richard Keeble of the University of Lincoln.

Mair, who has more than two hundred broadcast credits to his name, has worked as a producer or director on every BBC general election programme since 1979 as well as covering several world leader summits.

Media advisor
Having been born in the Caribbean, Mair introduced a professional regime at the region's state broadcaster. He has also had the distinction of being a media advisor to three presidents of Guyana: Cheddi Jagan, Janet Jagan and Bharrat Jagdeo.

On 4 October 2011, Mair was scheduled to give expert evidence to the House of Lords' Communications Committee on the state of investigative journalism.

Achievements
 Associate Fellow, Warwick University  
 Associate Fellow, Yesu Persaud Centre for Caribbean Studies 
 Visiting Professor, Zheijiang University of Media and Communications, China 
 Senior Lecturer Media and Communications, Coventry University 
 Events Director, The Media Society 
 Council Member, The Royal Television Society 
 National Judge, RTS TV Journalist of the Year 2010 
 RTS Journalism Award Winner 
 Society of Editors Journalist Award judge 
 Muslim Young Writers Award Judge

Works
Editor (with Richard Keeble) in the production of:- 
 Mirage in the Desert; Reporting the Arab Spring (Arima October 2011) 
 Investigative Journalism: Dead Or Alive (Arima September 2011)  
 Face the Future; Guyana and the New Media Revolution (July 2011) 
 Face the Future; Tools for the Modern Media Age (Arima April 2011) 
 Afghanistan, War and Terror; Deadlines and Frontlines (Arima September 2010) 
 Playing Footsie with the FTSE: The Great Crash/Financial Journalism (Arima 2009) 
 Do We Trust TV (Arima 2008)
 "Tough Hutt", SecEd, 2005 (12).

References

Year of birth missing (living people)
Living people
British mass media scholars
British television journalists
Academics of Coventry University
BBC television producers
British non-fiction writers
British male writers
Male non-fiction writers